Marguerite Krull is an American classical soprano who has had an active international performance career since the 1990s. Due to her wide vocal range, she also sings several roles traditionally performed by mezzo-sopranos.

Born and raised in Ann Arbor, Michigan, Krull attended the Peabody Institute at Johns Hopkins University where she earned a Bachelor of Music degree in Piano Performance. She went on to earn her master's degree in Vocal Performance from Stony Brook University. Early on in her career she won several prestigious awards, including the Marian Anderson Award in 1997, a Sullivan Foundation Award, and a  Richard R. Gold Career Grant.

Her recent performance credits include Donna Elvira in Wolfgang Amadeus Mozart's Don Giovanni at the Teatro Colón in Bogota, Emilia in George Frideric Handel’s Flavio at the New York City Opera, Cherubino in Mozart's The Marriage of Figaro at the Lyric Opera of Chicago, New Orleans Opera, and Opera Grand Rapids, and the title role of Gioachino Rossini's Elisabetta, regina d'Inghilterra at La Monnaie in Brussels and in Amsterdam. She also recently performed the title role in a semi-staged performances of Maurice Ravel's L'enfant et les sortilèges with the National Symphony Orchestra.

References

Biography on margueritekrull.com

American operatic sopranos
Living people
Year of birth missing (living people)
Musicians from Ann Arbor, Michigan
21st-century American women opera singers
Singers from Michigan
Classical musicians from Michigan
20th-century American women opera singers
Peabody Institute alumni
Stony Brook University alumni